Tribunal de Cassació (Catalan for Court of Cassation) was the Generalitat of Catalonia's judicial organization during the Second Spanish Republic, founded in 1934, established according to the Statute of Autonomy of Catalonia of 1932. It had jurisdiction in matters of administrative and civil law. Catalan was the main language of the Court.

Its first President was Santiago Gubern i Fàbregas (Barcelona, 1875 - 1960). On September 1936, after the outbreak of Spanish Civil War, Josep Andreu i Abelló (Montblanc, 1906 - Madrid, 1993) was appointed president of the Court of Cassation.

In 1939, once Catalonia was occupied by the army of general Franco during the last stages of the Civil War, its regime abolished the Court of Cassation and all of its Court judgments were declared without legal effect until 1984, five years after the restoration of Catalan self-government.

References

Bibliography
 Roca i Trias, Encarna. El tribunal de Cassació de la Generalitat republicana: La història d'una tradició prohibida, 2009, 18 pages from a conference (in Catalan)

Politics of Catalonia
Courts in Spain